Dhangu (Dhaŋu, Dangu) and Djangu (Djaŋu) constitute an Australian Aboriginal language of the Yolŋu group, spoken by the Dhaŋu and Djaŋu people in Australia's Northern Territory. The varieties of the two moieties of Dhangu are (a) Wan.gurri, Lamamirri and (b) Rirratjingu, Gaalpu, Ngayimil. There are two other Djangu (Djaŋu) dialects, Warramiri and Mandatja; dhangu and djangu are the words for "this" in the various dialects. Nhangu is a closely related language.

References

Yolŋu languages